"Make It Hot" is the third single released by British band VS, and the third taken from their debut studio album, All Kinds of Trouble (2004). The single was released on 11 October 2004, peaking at number 29 on the UK Singles Chart.

Track listings
 UK CD1  
 "Make It Hot" - 3:28
 "Call U Sexy" (Urban North Down South Mix) - 4:38
 
 UK CD2 
 "Make It Hot" - 3:28
 "Make It Hot" (Illicit Mix) - 4:03
 "All Kinds of Trouble" (Album Medley) - 3:05
 "Make It Hot" (Music Video) - 3:28

Charts

References

2004 singles
2004 songs
Innocent Records singles
Song recordings produced by Stargate (record producers)
Songs written by Hallgeir Rustan
Songs written by Tor Erik Hermansen
Songs written by Mikkel Storleer Eriksen
Virgin Records singles